StudySoup is a digital learning marketplace allowing purchase and sale of academic content including course notes, study guides, and tutoring services.

Background 
Sieva Kozinsky, an environmental studies graduate from UC Santa Barbara had difficulty concentrating because of the speed of the lecture and lack of supportive academic resources. Kozinsky along with Jeff Silverman started StudySoup in 2014 to source academic support and provide a means for students to earn money while in school.

Operations 
StudySoup is an online peer-to-peer learning market place that allow students to sell and purchase class notes and study guides. The sellers or Elite Notetakers have to undertake a training to understand the type of materials to be provided and its frequency. They have to submit notes every week and a study guide four days prior to every exam.

StudySoup 
StudySoup is a for-profit corporation that employs students as notetakers at various universities across the world in order to provide a more positive experience for undergraduate college students.

History 
Kozinsky and Silverman set out to provide students a new source of income and in the first year obtained 1.5 million students across the United States. The platform was opened up to more universities in 2016 as they pushed their borders outside of the United States and into Singapore and Canada. Several concerns about the legitimacy of StudySoup arose due to their changing business model.

Products 
There are only three products currently provided by StudySoup.

Class Notes & Study Guides 
StudySoup is known for its Elite Notetaker program, which recruits notetakers to apply to sell notes to other students for Karma Points, it sells a subscription to earn Karma and to gain access to the previous archives other notetakers have gathered over the years.

Textbook Solution Guides 
StudySoup provides step by step walk throughs explaining the questions in supported textbooks

On Demand Questions 
Students are given the ability to ask any question they want which will be answered within 24 to 48 hours.

Community 
StudySoups community consists of different levels of participants. Campus Marketing Coordinators are responsible for connecting schools together by recruiting notetakers and establishing an on campus presence. Elite Notetakers provide notes and study guides for students with disabilities or paying subscribers enrolled in the course. Finally the students complete the circle by paying for the notes they use.

Business Model 
This business is subscription based. Any one of three subscriptions can be purchased for various prices that provide access to the content students gather over the course of a school year.

References

2014 establishments in California
American companies established in 2014
Education companies of the United States